Bomba Calabrese is a spicy chili spread originating from the Calabria region of Italy.

See also
Chili oil
Peperoncino
Calabria

References 

Italian cuisine
Condiments